Paper toys are toys made of paper. They are constructed in several ways, by folding, as in paper airplanes, paper fortune tellers or Origami, or by cutting, decorating or assembling pieces of paper with glue or tape to create a paper doll or paper model.

History 

Paper toys date back to ancient times. The history of paper toys can be traced back to the art of origami (or-i-GA-me).The word is based on the Japanese words Ori, which means to fold, and Kami, which means paper. However origami's roots are from China and it spread to Japan somewhere around the sixth century. The craft was for only the rich at first because the cost of paper was very high. They found useful ways to use the folded paper. For example, they would fold it with strips of dried meat or fish and this was called Noshi, which was a token of good luck. Also they would often wrap the glasses of wine at a wedding into butterfly form to represent the bride and groom. As time went by new methods of making paper were developed which lowered the cost of paper. This allowed the art of origami to be more accessible to all people.

Paper dolls have been popular toys throughout the last couple of centuries. Unlike the origami and modern paper toys these are usually flat 2d dolls. Often various paper clothes and such things are used to decorate the doll. Much alike the modern paper toys they would often print dolls that resemble popular celebrities, singers, and political figures. They also would print these dolls in magazines for children to cut out and color, they would have a page for the figures and then a page of all the costumes and add-ons.

Modern paper toys 

Modern paper toys are made using paper, tape or glue, scissors and a printer. Most modern paper toys are digitally distributed patterns that are printed and cut to be folded into the desired shape. There are many websites and blogs where these downloads are available. There are a wide variety of blank templates that can be downloaded and customized as well. Most often the template will be created in a program such as Adobe Illustrator, Adobe Photoshop or Pepakura and then uploaded as a .pdf, JPG or other image file type.

See also 
 Action origami
 Cardboard modeling
 Net (polyhedron)
 Origamic architecture
 Paper plane
 Paper prototyping
 Paper model
 Pop-up books

References 

 
Art and craft toys